Leesa Wynn Hagan is an American politician from Georgia who serves in the Georgia House of Representatives. Her district includes pieces of Appling, Emanuel, Jeff Davis, Montgomery, and Toombs counties. She was elected to represent the seat as a Republican in a special election on July 13, 2021.

References

Republican Party members of the Georgia House of Representatives
21st-century American politicians
Living people
1972 births